The Approach is the debut album of the Illinois-based industrial band, I:Scintilla. Production on the album began immediately after the formation of the band and it was produced by guitarist Jim Cookas.

It is currently out of print, but secondhand copies can still be found online.

Track listing 
 "Intro" - 1:32
 "Imitation" - 4:21
 "Logic + Lack Thereof" - 0:17
 "Capsella Bursa Pastoris" - 5:24
 "Fidelidad [Estrogen Mix]" - 4:19
 "Scin" - 4:33
 "Translate" - 5:08
 "Havestar" - 4:35
 "The Intruder, Part IV" - 3:12
 "The Bells" - 7:36

I:Scintilla albums
2004 debut albums